Billy Elliot the Musical Live is a 2014 British filmed version of Elton John's coming-of-age stage musical Billy Elliot the Musical (2005), which in turn was based on the 2000 film Billy Elliot. Stephen Daldry directed both the original film and the 2014 musical adaptation.

Filmed on 28 September 2014 at the Victoria Palace Theatre in London's West End, Billy Elliot Live was broadcast live to cinemas in several European countries, followed by further worldwide screenings. North American screenings took place on 12, 15, and 18 November.

The filmed production stars Elliott Hanna as Billy, Ruthie Henshall as Mrs. Wilkinson, and Deka Walmsley, Ann Emery, and Chris Grahamson as Billy's father, grandmother, and older brother, respectively.

Plot

Act I
In County Durham, the 1984–85 coal miners' strike is just beginning ("The Stars Look Down"). Motherless eleven-year-old Billy is required to stay behind after his boxing class and finds his way into a ballet class run by Mrs Wilkinson. He is the only boy, but becomes attracted to the grace of the dance ("Shine"). The secret is at first easily kept, as the only person home at the time is his grandmother. She reveals her abusive relationship with her dead husband and that she too loved to dance, which made everything all right ("Grandma's Song").

While Billy's father Jackie, brother Tony and neighbours are on strike and clash with riot police, he continues to take dance lessons, keeping it a secret from his family ("Solidarity"), a number which intersperses the violent reality of the strike with the peaceful practice of ballet.

Eventually, Jackie discovers Billy in the ballet class and forbids him from attending the lessons. Mrs Wilkinson, who recognizes Billy's talent, privately suggests that he should audition for the Royal Ballet School in London. To prepare for the audition, she offers free private lessons. Billy is not sure what he wants to do so he visits his best friend Michael for advice. He finds Michael wearing a dress. He persuades Billy to have fun with him by dressing up in women's clothing and disdaining the restrictive inhibitions of their working class community ("Expressing Yourself").

Billy arrives for his first private ballet lesson bringing with him things to inspire a special dance for the audition ("Dear Billy (Mum's Letter)"). He begins learning from and bonding with Mrs Wilkinson while he develops an impressive routine for his audition ("Born to Boogie"). Mrs Wilkinson's daughter Debbie tries to discourage Billy because she has a crush on him. Meanwhile, Jackie and Tony are engaged in daily battles with riot police that often turn bloody. They struggle to support the family with very little strike and union pay, a difficult task that goes on for nearly a year.

When the day of the Royal Ballet School audition arrives, police are coming through the village and Tony has been injured by the police. Because Billy had not come to the miner's hall to get picked up by Mrs Wilkinson for the audition, she goes to the Elliot home. Billy's family and some members of the community have gathered there. She is forced to reveal that she has been teaching Billy ballet in preparation for this very day. This news upsets Jackie and Tony, who gets in an argument with Mrs Wilkinson. Tony tries to force Billy to dance on the table in front of everyone. The police approach and, as everyone escapes, Billy calls out to his father saying that his mother would have let him dance, but Jackie refuses to accept that, saying that "Your Mam's dead!". Billy goes into a rage ("Angry Dance"), and for nearly a year, stays away from anything related to ballet.

Act II
Six months later, at the miners' annual Christmas show, the children put on a show disparaging Prime Minister Margaret Thatcher, who is seen as the antagonist by the coal miners ("Merry Christmas, Maggie Thatcher"). Jackie gets drunk and sings an old folk song that elicits memories of his deceased wife and the usually stoic man leaves in tears ("Deep Into the Ground"). Left alone with Billy in the community centre, Michael reveals he has feelings for him, but Billy explains that the fact that he likes ballet does not mean that he is gay. Michael gives him a kiss on the cheek. Michael tries to get Billy to show him some dancing, but Billy is sad and just tells him to leave.

Michael departs, but leaves a music player running. Billy feels like dancing for the first time since the day of the aborted audition and dances while dreaming of being a grown-up dancer ("Dream Ballet"). Unknown to Billy, his father arrives and watches him dance. Overcome with emotion, his father goes to Mrs Wilkinson’s house to discuss Billy's prospects as a dancer. She confirms Billy's talent, but is not sure whether or not he would get into the Royal Ballet School. Mrs Wilkinson offers to help pay for the trip to London for the audition, but Jackie refuses. He leaves questioning his working-class pride and the future of mining for his boys.

Jackie decides the only way to help Billy is to return to work. When Tony sees his father cross the picket line, he becomes infuriated and the two argue over what is more important: unity of the miners or helping Billy achieve his dream ("He Could Be A Star"). The argument eventually comes to blows and Billy is accidentally hit. One of the miners chastises them for fighting and says that the important thing is looking after the child. One by one, the miners give money to help pay for the trip to the audition, but Billy still does not have enough for the bus fare to London. A strike-breaker arrives and offers him hundreds of pounds. An enraged Tony attempts to shun his donation, but no one else speaks up in his support. Now drained of hope, Tony dismally ponders whether there's a point for anything any more, and runs off.

Billy and his father arrive at the Royal Ballet School for the audition. While Jackie waits outside, an upper-crust Londoner highlights the contrast between the Elliots and the families of the other applicants. Jackie meets a dancer with a thick Scottish accent. The dancer confesses that his father does not support his ballet career. He sharply advises Jackie to "get behind" his boy. Billy nervously finishes the audition with a sinking feeling that he did not do well. As he packs his gear, he lets that emotion overwhelm him and he punches another dancer who was trying to comfort him. The audition committee reminds Billy of the strict standards of the school. They have received an enthusiastic letter from Mrs Wilkinson explaining Billy's background and situation, and they ask him to describe what it feels like when he dances. Billy responds with a heartfelt declaration of his passion ("Electricity").

Back in Durham, the Elliots resume life, but times are tough and the miners are running a soup kitchen to ensure everyone is fed. Eventually, Billy receives a letter from the school and, overwhelmed and fearful, knowing that it heralds the end of the life he has known, informs his family that he wasn't accepted. Tony retrieves the letter from the waste bin and discovers that his brother was accepted. At the same time, the miners' union has caved in; they lost the strike. Billy visits Mrs Wilkinson at the dance class to thank her for everything she did to help him. Debbie is sad that Billy will be leaving.

Billy packs his things for the trip to the school and says goodbye to the soon to be unemployed miners who are unhappily returning to work ("Once We Were Kings"). Billy says goodbye to his dead mother, who often visits him in his imagination ("Dear Billy (Billy's Reply)"). Michael arrives to say goodbye and Billy gives him a kiss on the cheek. Billy takes his suitcase and walks out to his future alone.

The entire cast comes out on stage and calls Billy back to celebrate the bright future ahead of him ("Finale").

Cast

 Elliott Hanna as Billy Elliot
 Ruthie Henshall as Sandra Wilkinson
 Deka Walmsley as Jackie Elliot
 Ann Emery as Grandma
 Chris Grahamson as Tony Elliot
 Zach Atkinson as Michael Caffrey
 Liam Mower as Older Billy
 David Muscat as Mr. Braithwaite
 Claudia Bradley as Mrs. Elliot
 Howard Crossley as George
 Demi Lee as Debbie Wilkinson
 Alan Mehdizadeh as Big Davey
 Liam Sargeant as Small boy
 Caspar Meurisse as Tall boy
 David Stoller as Scab / Posh Dad
 Rueben Williams as Riot Officer

Ballet girls
 Niamh Bennett
 Ella Forman
 Imogen Gurney
 Lauren Henson
 Imogen Kingsley Smith
 Erin McIver
 Syakira Moeladi
 Natasha Pye
 Charlotte Ross-Gower
 Sophie Smart

Billy's Past & Present (special finale)
(bow order matching dates of tenure)
 Liam Mower
 George Maguire
 James Lomas
 Leon Cooke
 Matthew Koon
 Dean McCarthy
 Layton Williams
 Joshua Fedrick
 Fox Jackson-Keen
 Tom Holland
 Corey Dodd
 Ollie Gardner
 Rhys Yeomans
 Aaron Watson
 Scott McKenzie
 Josh Baker
 Ryan Collinson
 Kaine Ward
 Harris Beattie
 Harrison Dowzell
 Redmand Rance
 Ali Rasul
 Elliott Hanna
 Bradley Perret
 Matteo Zecca
 Ollie Jochim

Musical numbers

Act I
 "The Stars Look Down" – Company
 "Shine" – Ballet Girls, Mrs. Wilkinson, and Mr Braithwaite
 "Grandma's Song" – Grandma
 "Solidarity" – Ballet Girls, Billy, Mrs. Wilkinson, Miners, and Police
 "Expressing Yourself" – Billy, Michael, and Ensemble
 "The Letter (Mum's Letter)" – Mrs. Wilkinson, Mum, and Billy
 "Born to Boogie" – Mrs. Wilkinson, Billy, and Mr. Braithwaite
 "Angry Dance" – Billy and Male Ensemble

Act II
 "Merry Christmas, Maggie Thatcher" – Tony and Partiers
 "Deep Into the Ground" – Jackie
 "Dream Ballet" – Billy and Older Billy
 "He Could Be a Star" – Jackie, Tony, and Miners
 "Electricity" – Billy
 "Once We Were Kings" – Company
 "The Letter (Billy's Reply)" – Billy and Mum
 Finale – Company

Release
Billy Elliot the Musical Live topped the UK and Ireland box office the weekend it was broadcast, a first for an event cinema release, beating The Equalizer with £1.9 million ($3,094,159).

Home media
The film was released 24 November 2014 on DVD and Blu-ray in the United Kingdom. This release differs slightly from what was originally theatrically broadcast in that certain camera angles were changed and that it incorporates shots from a practice shoot the day prior to the original live broadcast. It was released on DVD and Blu-ray in the United States on 13 October 2015.

References

External links
 
 

2014 films
2010s musical comedy-drama films
British musical comedy-drama films
Films directed by Stephen Daldry
Films based on musicals based on films
Films set in London
Films shot in London
Filmed stage productions
Universal Pictures films
2014 comedy films
2014 drama films
2010s English-language films
2010s British films